Constantin Floros (Greek: Κωνσταντίνος Φλωρος) (born Thessaloniki 4 January 1930) is a Greek-German musicologist. He studied law at the University of Thessaloniki (1947–1951) and then composition and conducting at the Vienna Music Academy. At the same time he studied musicology with Erich Schenk at the Vienna University as well as art history (with C. Swoboda), philosophy and psychology. In 1955 he obtained the doctorate in Vienna with a dissertation on Campioni. He continued his musicological studies with Husmann at Hamburg University (1957–1960), where in 1961 he completed his Habilitation in musicology with a work on the Byzantine kontakion. In 1967 he became supernumerary professor, in 1972 professor of musicology and in 1995 professor emeritus at the University of Hamburg. He received the honorary doctorate from the University of Athens in 1999.

He is the co-editor of the Hamburger Jahrbuch fur Musikwissenschaft and in 1988 he founded and became president of the Gustav Mahler Vereinigung, Hamburg. In 1992 he was elected a member of the Erfurt Akademie der gemeinnützigen Wissenschaften and in 1999 was made an honorary member of the Richard Wagner-Verband, Hamburg.
   
Floros' interests include the origin of Gregorian neumes, various aspects of Byzantine music, connections between the music cultures of East and West, the semantic meaning of the 18th and 19th century symphony, the music of the Second Viennese School.

Selected publications
 New Ears for New Music (English translation, 2014) Peter Lang; 
 Gyoergy Ligeti: Beyond Avant-Garde and Postmodernism, Peter Lang; 
 Alban Berg: Music as Autobiography, Peter Lang;

References

Sources
The New Grove Dictionary of Music and Musicians

1930 births
Living people
Greek musicologists
University of Hamburg alumni
University of Music and Performing Arts Vienna alumni
Members of the European Academy of Sciences and Arts
Ligeti scholars
Mahler scholars
People from Thessaloniki